There are over 9,000 Grade I listed buildings in England. This page is a list of these buildings in the district of Boston in Lincolnshire.

List of buildings

|}

See also
 Grade II* listed buildings in Boston (borough)

Notes

Lists of Grade I listed buildings in Lincolnshire

Grade I listed buildings in Boston (borough)